UDP-N-acetylglucosamine transferase subunit ALG13 homolog, also known as asparagine-linked glycosylation 13 homolog, is an enzyme that in humans is encoded by the ALG13 gene.

Function 

The protein encoded by this gene is a subunit of a bipartite UDP-N-acetylglucosamine transferase. It heterodimerizes with asparagine-linked glycosylation 14 (ALG14) homolog to form a functional UDP-GlcNAc glycosyltransferase that catalyzes the second sugar addition of the highly conserved oligosaccharide precursor in endoplasmic reticulum N-linked glycosylation.

See also
 Congenital disorder of glycosylation

References

External links

Further reading

Human proteins